Nehoiu is a town in Buzău County, Muntenia, Romania, with a population of 11,631. Wood processing is the local main economic activity. The town has a lumbermill since the early 20th century. It officially became a town in 1989, as a result of the Romanian rural systematization program.

The town administers nine villages: Bâsca Rozilei, Chirlești, Curmătura, Lunca Priporului, Mlăjet, Nehoiașu, Păltineni, Stănila, and Vinețișu.

Nehoiu is located in the northwestern part of the county,  from the county seat, Buzău. It lies in a hilly area at the foot of the Curvature Carpathians, on the banks of the Buzău River. 

The town is traversed by national road DN10, which crosses the Carpathians, joining Buzău to Brașov. The train station in Nehoiașu is the terminus for the CFR Line 504, which starts in Buzău.

Natives
 Daniel Alexandru David (born 1983), footballer.
 Mariana Solomon (born 1980), triple jumper.

References

External links

 Nehoiu tourist information

Towns in Romania
Populated places in Buzău County
Localities in Muntenia